Miltiades or Miltiadis (short: Miltos) is a Greek masculine given name. The name is derived from the Greek word for "red earth". 

People with the given name include:
 Miltiades the Younger (c. 550–489 BC), tyrant of the Thracian Chersonese and the Athenian commanding general in the Battle of Marathon
 Miltiades the Elder (died c. 524 BC), wealthy Athenian, and step-uncle of Miltiades the Younger
 Pope Miltiades (died 314), African saint and pope
 Miltiades Caridis (1923–1998), German-Greek conductor
 Miltiadis Evert (1939–2011), Greek politician
 Miltos Gkougkoulakis (born 1977), Greek footballer
 Miltiadis Goulimis (1844–1896), Greek politician
 Miltiadis Iatridis (1906–1960), Greek naval officer in World War II
 Miltiadis Manakis (1880–1964), one of the Manakis brothers, Greek pioneering photographer and filmmaker, aka Milton Manachia
 Miltos Papapostolou (1936–2017), Greek football manager 
 Miltos Sachtouris (1919–2005), Greek poet
 Miltiadis Sapanis (born 1976), Greek footballer
 Miltiadis Tentoglou (born 1998), Greek long jump athlete and Olympic gold medalist

References 

Greek masculine given names